Micropterix aruncella is a species of moth belonging to the family Micropterigidae, which is distributed throughout Europe. The imago was first described by Giovanni Antonio Scopoli in 1763.

Description
This very small moth has a maximum forewing length of only . The colour of the forewings is rather variable but is usually reddish golden. Females usually have no other markings but males are marked with two silvery white bands. They can be found in various dry habitats including downland and hillsides.

Ecology

Like other members of the family, this species has functional jaws and it feeds as an adult on pollen grains from a wide variety of flowers including those of hawthorn (Crataegus species), Cytisus, Lychnis, pine (Pinus species), Plantago, rose (Rosa species), nettle (Urtica species) and Veronica as well as numerous grasses. Depending on elevation and latitude, the adults may be encountered in daytime from May to August.

Similar species
The females are similar to Micropterix calthella but has the whole base of the forewing purple, compared with M. calthella which has a purple patch on the base of the costa (although calthella often has purple suffusion scattered over the forewing). In Britain both species can be found, during the day, on creeping buttercup (Ranunculus repens), but the UKmoths website recommends searching the lower flowers of hawthorn Crataegus monogyna for M. aruncella.

Larva
The larva feeds on detritus at the base of herbaceous plants before pupating in a tough cocoon.

Distribution
Found throughout mainland Europe except Bulgaria and Portugal.

Taxonomy
The name Micropterix was raised by the German entomologist, Jacob Hübner in 1825 and comes from the Greek for mikros – little, and pterux – a wing. The specific name aruncella refers to the plant, goat's beard (Spiraea aruncus), on which moths have been found feeding on the pollen.

References

Further reading

External links
 Micropterix aruncella at Naturhistoriska riksmuseet
 Meyrick, E., 1895 A Handbook of British Lepidoptera MacMillan, London pdf page 806 Keys and description

Articles containing video clips
Micropterigidae
Moths described in 1763
Moths of Europe
Taxa named by Giovanni Antonio Scopoli